Batting position is a player's position on the batting order and may refer to:

Batting order (cricket)
Batting order (baseball)